Satch and Josh is a 1974 album by Oscar Peterson and Count Basie.

Track listing
 "Buns" (Count Basie, Oscar Peterson) - 4:35
 "These Foolish Things (Remind Me of You)" (Harry Link, Holt Marvell, Jack Strachey) - 5:42
 "R.B." (Basie, Peterson) - 5:34
 "Burnin'" (Basie, Peterson) - 4:13
 "Exactly Like You" (Dorothy Fields, Jimmy McHugh) - 6:18
 "Jumpin' at the Woodside" (Basie) - 2:53
 "Louie B." (Basie, Peterson) - 6:20
 "Lester Leaps In" (Lester Young) - 4:07
 "Big Stockings" (Basie, Peterson) - 4:27
 "S & J Blues" (Basie, Peterson) - 7:52

Personnel
 Count Basie - piano, organ
 Oscar Peterson - piano
 Freddie Green - guitar
 Ray Brown - double bass
 Louie Bellson - drums
 Benny Green  - liner notes
 Norman Granz - producer
Recorded December 2, 1974, Group IV Recording Studios, Hollywood, Los Angeles, California:

References

1974 albums
Count Basie albums
Oscar Peterson albums
Pablo Records albums
Albums produced by Norman Granz